SC Ostbahn XI are an Austrian association football club based in the Simmering (XI) district of Vienna. Founded in 1921 by employees of the East railway line, they are playing in the Austrian 2. Landesliga.

Current squad

Staff
 Trainer:  Kurt Jusits
 Co-Trainer: Gerald Hauer
 Co-Trainer: Markus Millner
 Goalkeeper coach:  Herbert Gundacker

External links
 http://www.ostbahn11.at/  Official Website

Association football clubs established in 1921
Ostbahn XI,SC
1921 establishments in Austria
Ostbahn XI,SC